Eugene Tan Kheng Boon (born 18 February 1970) is an associate professor of law at Singapore Management University. Tan served as a Nominated Member of Parliament between 14 February 2012 and 13 August 2014.

Tan holds degrees from the National University of Singapore Faculty of Law, the London School of Economics, and Stanford University. He previously held positions at the National University of Singapore and worked as foreign service officer in Singapore's Ministry of Foreign Affairs. He teaches and researches in the area of Constitutional and Administrative Law as well as the Law and Policy of Ethnic Relations in Singapore.

Tan regularly writes for several news providers in Singapore. He is also quoted regularly in all news sources within Singapore, and in major international press, particularly on matters related to domestic politics, constitutional law and elections.

References

1970 births
Living people
Alumni of the London School of Economics
Academic staff of Singapore Management University School of Law
National University of Singapore alumni
Raffles Institution alumni
Singaporean Nominated Members of Parliament
Singaporean people of Chinese descent
Stanford University alumni